Zhang Baowen (born November, 1946) is a Chinese politician who served as a vice chairman of the Standing Committee of the National People's Congress and the chairman of the China Democratic League.

References 

1946 births
Living people
Chairperson and vice chairpersons of the Standing Committee of the 12th National People's Congress
Chairpersons of the China Democratic League
Members of the Standing Committee of the 9th Chinese People's Political Consultative Conference
Members of the Standing Committee of the 10th Chinese People's Political Consultative Conference
Members of the Standing Committee of the 11th Chinese People's Political Consultative Conference
University of Minnesota alumni